Chequest was an unincorporated community in Davis County, Iowa, United States. Its elevation is 722 feet (287 m). It was on County Road V42 near Chequest Creek.

History

The Chequest post office opened under the name Hall in 1884, was changed to Chequest in 1887, and closed permanently in 1905. 

Chequest's population was 15 in 1887, 13 in 1902, 42 in 1917, and 15 in 1925.

References

Unincorporated communities in Davis County, Iowa
Unincorporated communities in Iowa